Warren Dale Newson (born July 3, 1964) is an American former professional baseball outfielder. He played all or part of eight seasons in Major League Baseball (MLB) from 1991-98. Newson played for the Chicago White Sox (1991–1995), Seattle Mariners (1995) and Texas Rangers (1996–1998). He also played for the Kia Tigers of the KBO League in 2002.

While playing for the White Sox, Newson was given the nickname "The Deacon" by the team's longtime television play-by-play announcer, Ken Harrelson. Newson possessed exceptional strike zone judgment, prompting Bill James to herald him as a freely-available player who could help many teams win.

External links

Career statistics and player information from Korea Baseball Organization

1964 births
Living people
Acereros de Monclova players
African-American baseball players
Albuquerque Dukes players
Algodoneros de Torreón players
American expatriate baseball players in Canada
American expatriate baseball players in Mexico
American expatriate baseball players in South Korea
Baseball players from Georgia (U.S. state)
Charleston Rainbows players
Chicago White Sox players
KBO League outfielders
Kia Tigers players
Las Vegas Stars (baseball) players
Major League Baseball outfielders
Memphis Redbirds players
Mexican League baseball outfielders
Middle Georgia Warriors baseball players
Nashville Sounds players
Oklahoma RedHawks players
Olmecas de Tabasco players
People from Newnan, Georgia
Reno Padres players
Riverside Red Wave players
Seattle Mariners players
Spokane Indians players
Sportspeople from the Atlanta metropolitan area
St. Paul Saints players
Sultanes de Monterrey players
Texas Rangers players
Tulsa Drillers players
Vancouver Canadians players
Wichita Wranglers players
Winnipeg Goldeyes players
21st-century African-American people
20th-century African-American sportspeople